{{DISPLAYTITLE:C17H23NO2}}
The molecular formula C17H23NO2 (molar mass: 273.37 g/mol) may refer to:

 Allylnorpethidine (WIN-7681)
 5-DBFPV
 RTI-32
 Tilidine
 Tropanserin

Molecular formulas